This provides a summary of the results of elections to the United States House of Representatives from the first election held variably in 1788 or 1789 (different states held elections at different times) to 1822. This time period corresponds to the First Party System of the United States. For more detailed results of each election, see the main page for that election. Information about the popular vote in early elections is not available as records of the popular vote were not kept. Parties with a majority in the House of Representatives are shown in bold.


See also
 List of United States House of Representatives elections (1824–1854)
 List of United States House of Representatives elections (1856–present)
 First Party System

Notes

References

Bibliography

External links
 History, Art & Archives United States House of Representatives

1789-1822
House of Representatives elections, 1789-1822